Leon Tyrone Pennington (born December 25, 1963) is a former American football linebacker who played three games for the Tampa Bay Buccaneers of the National Football League in 1987. He played college football at University of Florida.

References 

Living people
1963 births
American football linebackers
Florida Gators football players
Tampa Bay Buccaneers players